Jon Deeks is a professor of biostatistics at the University of Birmingham, England.

References

Living people
Academics of the University of Birmingham
Biostatisticians
Year of birth missing (living people)
NIHR Senior Investigators